Akolawa  is a village development region committee in Rautahat District in the Narayani Zone of central development region of  Nepal. At the time of the 1991 Nepal census it had a population of 4238 people living in 744 individual households.

References

Populated places in Rautahat District